Andrej Aliaksandravič Hardziejeǔ (commonly transliterated as Andrei Hardzeyeu; born 7 August 1973) is a Belarusian marathon runner. He achieved his personal best time of 2:11:44 by winning the gold medal at the 2001 Hannover Marathon.

At age thirty-five, Hardzeyeu made his official debut for the 2008 Summer Olympics in Beijing, where he competed in the men's marathon. He did not finish the entire race, before reaching the 25 km lap of the course.

References

External links

NBC Olympics Profile

Belarusian male marathon runners
Living people
Olympic athletes of Belarus
Athletes (track and field) at the 2008 Summer Olympics
People from Mogilev
1973 births
Sportspeople from Mogilev Region